The National Museum of Toys and Miniatures, formerly known as the Kansas City Toy and Miniature Museum, is located on the campus of the University of Missouri Kansas City. (Bequeathed to the University in the 1960s, the home was originally designed for physician Herbert Tureman in 1906 by noted architect John McKecknie and completed by 1911.) Opened in 1982, the museum today boasts the world's largest collection of fine-scale miniatures and one of the nation's largest collections of antique toys on public display.

Boasting more than 33,000 square feet of exhibit space and a collection of more than 72,000 objects, the museum currently welcomes about 30,000 visitors a year. The museum has undergone two expansions in its more than 30 years of operation.

At its origin, the Museum combined the toy collection of Mary Harris Francis with the fine miniature collection of Barbara Hall Marshall; the two women were avid collectors as well as lifelong friends.

References

External links
 National Museum of Toys and Miniatures website

Doll museums
Museums in Kansas City, Missouri
Museums established in 1982
Children's museums in Missouri
History museums in Missouri
University museums in Missouri
Toy museums in the United States
University of Missouri–Kansas City
1982 establishments in Missouri